Sokn is an island in Stavanger municipality in Rogaland county, Norway.  The  island lies in a group of islands on the south side of the Boknafjorden, just east of the city of Stavanger. There are several islands surrounding Sokn: Bru to the southwest, Åmøy to the southeast, and Mosterøy to the north.  All three islands are connected to Sokn by bridges, and the undersea Byfjord Tunnel has its northern terminus on the island, connecting all these islands to the mainland.

Most of the island is covered with farms or moorland, with most of the population living along the southeastern shore.

See also
List of islands of Norway

References

Islands of Stavanger